The Deutscher Werkbund (English: "German Association of Craftsmen") is a German association of artists, architects, designers and industrialists established in 1907. The Werkbund became an important element in the development of modern architecture and industrial design, particularly in the later creation of the Bauhaus school of design. Its initial purpose was to establish a partnership of product manufacturers with design professionals to improve the competitiveness of German companies in global markets. The Werkbund was less an artistic movement than a state-sponsored effort to integrate traditional crafts and industrial mass production techniques, to put Germany on a competitive footing with England and the United States.  Its motto Vom Sofakissen zum Städtebau (from sofa cushions to city-building) indicates its range of interest.

History
The Deutscher Werkbund emerged when the architect Joseph Maria Olbrich left Vienna for Darmstadt, Germany, in 1899, to form an artists' colony at the invitation of Ernest Louis, Grand Duke of Hesse. The Werkbund was founded by Olbrich, Peter Behrens, Richard Riemerschmid, Bruno Paul and others in 1907 in Munich at the instigation of Hermann Muthesius, existed through 1934, then re-established after World War II in 1950.  Muthesius was the author of the exhaustive three-volume "The English House" of 1905, a survey of the practical lessons of the English Arts and Crafts movement. Muthesius was seen as something of a cultural ambassador, or industrial spy, between Germany and England.

The organization originally included twelve architects and twelve business firms. The architects include Peter Behrens, Theodor Fischer (who served as its first president), Josef Hoffmann, Bruno Paul, Max Laeuger and Richard Riemerschmid. Other architects affiliated with the project include Heinrich Tessenow and the Belgian Henry van de Velde. By 1914 it had 1,870 members, including heads of museums. The Werkbund commissioned van de Velde to design a theater for the 1914 Werkbund Exhibition in Cologne. The exhibition was closed and the buildings dismantled ahead of schedule because of the outbreak of World War I.  Eliel Saarinen was made corresponding member of the Deutscher Werkbund in 1914 and was invited to participate in the 1914 Cologne exhibition. Among the Werkbund's more noted members was the architect Mies van der Rohe, who served as Architectural Director.

Key dates of the Deutscher Werkbund
 1907, Establishment of the Werkbund in Munich 
 1910, Salon d'Automne, Paris
 1914, Werkbund Exhibition, Cologne
 1920, Lilly Reich becomes the first female Director  
 1924, Berlin exhibition  
 1927, Stuttgart exhibition (including the Weissenhof Estate) 
 1929, Breslau exhibition  
 1934, Werkbund declare dissolution 
 1947, Reestablishment

100th anniversary
The Verband Deutscher Industrie Designer (Association of German Industrial Designers, or VDID) and the Bund Deutscher Grafik-Designer (Federation of German Graphic Designers, or "BDG-Mitte") held a joint meeting to celebrate the 100th anniversary of the Deutscher Werkbund. A juried exhibition and opening was held on 14 March 2008.

Museum der Dinge
The collections and archives (Werkbundarchiv) of the Werkbund are housed at the Museum der Dinge (Museum of Things) in Berlin. The museum is focused on design and objects used in everyday life in the 20th century up to the present. Among other exhibits, it includes a Frankfurt kitchen.

Members

 Konrad Adenauer
 Friedrich Adler
 Adolf Arndt
 Anker-Werke Delmenhorst
 Ferdinand Avenarius
 Otto Bartning
 Willi Baumeister
 Adolf Behne
 Hendrik Petrus Berlage
 Richard Berndl
 Johann Michael Bossard
 Raymund Brachmann
 Fritz August Breuhaus de Groot
 Bazon Brock
 Ulrich Böhme
 Max Burchartz
 Charles Crodel
 Carl Otto Czeschka
 Wilhelm von Debschitz
 Franz Karl Delavilla
 Peter A. Demeter
 Walter Dexel
 Eugen Diederichs
 Bruno Dörpinghaus
 Karl Duschek
 Adolph Eckhardt
 Egon Eiermann
 Albert Eitel
 August Endell
 Jupp Ernst
 Lyonel Feininger
 Wend Fischer
 Karl Ganser
 Hansjörg Göritz
 Hermann Gretsch
 Walter Gropius
 Moritz Hadda
 Richard Hamann
 Luise Harkort
 Hugo Häring
 Hans Heckner
 Max Heidrich
 Erwin Heerich
 Hans Hertlein
 Max Hertwig
 Lucy Hillebrand
 Georg Hirth
 Theodor Heuss
 Ot Hoffmann
 Helmut Hofmann
 Ferdy Horrmeyer
 Paul Horst-Schulze
 Klaus Humpert
 Walter Maria Kersting
 Harald Kimpel
 Moissey Kogan
 Hans P. Koellmann
 Ludwig König
 Ernst Kühn
 Hugo Kükelhaus
 Klaus Küster
 Ferdinand Kramer
 Günter Kupetz
 Emil Lange
 Carl Langhein
 Josef Lehmbrock
 El Lissitzky
 Johannes Ludovicus Mathieu Lauweriks
 Richard Luksch
 Gerhard Marcks
 Ewald Mataré
 Ernst May
 Kunstmuseen Krefeld
 Erich Mendelsohn
 Wolfgang Meisenheimer
 Georg Metzendorf
 Mies van der Rohe
 Leberecht Migge
 Anna Muthesius
 Hermann Muthesius
 Friedrich Naumann
 Walter Neuhäusser
 Hans Neumann
 Karl Ernst Osthaus
 Ludwig Paffendorf
 Bernhard Pankok
 Karl Poser
 Walfried Pohl
 Jan Thorn Prikker
 Peter Raacke
 Adolf Rading
 Jochen Rahe
 Dieter Rams
 Walther Rathenau
 Carl Rehorst
 Lilly Reich
 Albert Reimann
 Albert Renger-Patzsch
 Paul Renner
 Richard Riemerschmid
 Alexander Michailowitsch Rodtschenko
 Gregor Rosenbauer
 Walter Rossow
 Werner Ruhnau
 Hans Scharoun
 Karl Schmidt-Hellerau
 Willy Schönefeld
 Werner Schriefers
 Rudolf Alexander Schröder
 Reinhard Schulze
 Fritz Schupp
 Margarete Schütte-Lihotzky
 Walter Schwagenscheidt
 Rudolf Schwarz
 Hans Schwippert
 Ferdinand Selle
 Bernd Sikora
 Anna Simons
 Carl Sonntag jun.
 Friedrich Spengelin
 Bernhard Stadler
 Anton Stankowski
 Heinz Stoffregen
 Ludwig Sütterlin
 Heinrich Straumer
 Gustav Stresemann
 Bruno Taut
 Heinrich Tessenow
 Paul Thiersch
 Emil Thormählen
 Walter Tiemann
 Paul Ludwig Troost
 Otto Ubbelohde
 Henry van de Velde
 Theodor Veil
 Otto Voelckers
 Heinrich Vogeler
 Fritz Wärndorfer
 Wilhelm Wagenfeld
 Otto Wagner
 Udo Weilacher
 Werkbund Werkstatt Nürnberg
 Edward Weston
 Alfred Wiener
 Karl With
 Dieter Witte
 Georg Wrba
 Christoph Zöpel
 Berta Zuckerkandl

See also 
 New Objectivity (architecture)
 Modern architecture
 WUWA (Breslau)

References

Further reading
 Lucius Burckhardt (1987). The Werkbund. Hyperion Press. 
 Frederic J. Schwartz (1996). The Werkbund: Design Theory and Mass Culture Before the First World War. New Haven, Conn. : Yale University Press. 
 Mark Jarzombek. "Joseph August Lux: Werkbund Promoter, Historian of a Lost Modernity," Journal of the Society of Architectural Historians 63/1 (June 2004): 202–219.
 Ot Hoffmann im Auftrag des DWB: Der Deutsche Werkbund – 1907, 1947, 1987. Wilhelm Ernst & Sohn, Frankfurt 1987, . 
 Yuko Ikeda: Vom Sofakissen zum Städtebau. Hermann Muthesius und der Deutsche Werkbund. Modern Design in Deutschland 1900–1927. Ausstellungskatalog. The National Museum of Modern Art, Kyoto 2002, .
 Karl-Ernst-Osthaus-Museum Hagen und Kaiser-Wilhelm-Museum Krefeld: Das Schöne und der Alltag – Deutsches Museum für Kunst in Handel und Gewerbe. Ausstellungskatalog. Pandora Snoeck-Ducaju & Zoon, Gent 1997, .

External links 

 
 Werkbundarchiv: Museum der Dinge – official site

Bauhaus
1907 establishments in Germany
Industrial design
Graphic design
Modernist architecture in Germany
Architecture groups